William L. Klein (1901 – January 3, 1957) was an American professional golfer. He won nine PGA Tour events during his career. He played in the 1923 PGA Championship, winning a first round match, and also played in the 1935 Masters Tournament.

In 2007, Klein was inducted into the Metropolitan PGA Section Hall of Fame.

Early life
Klein was born in 1901 on Long Island, New York.

Golf career
Klein worked as the head pro at Wheatley Hills Golf Club in East Williston, New York, from 1926 to 1957. He also worked in the winter months at the La Gorce Country Club in Miami Beach, Florida, from 1927 to 1956. Klein also played on what later became the PGA Tour, winning nine events.

1923 PGA Championship
The 1923 PGA Championship was held September 24–29 at the Pelham Country Club in Pelham Manor, New York. Klein was in the starting field and opened up affairs in a first round match against Charles Rowe which he won by the score of 4 and 3. He lost his second round match to Alec Campbell by the identical score.

Death and legacy
Klein died in Mineola, New York. In 2007, Klein was inducted into the Metropolitan PGA Section Hall of Fame.

Professional wins

PGA Tour wins (9)
1924 (1) one win
1925 (1) Miami Open
1926 (1) one win
1928 (1) New York State Open
1929 (1) Mid-South Open
1932 (1) Metropolitan PGA Championship
1936 (1) Miami Open
missing two other wins, one 1916-29, one 1930-45

Other wins
1922 Long Island Open
1923 Long Island Open
1933 Long Island Open

References

American male golfers
PGA Tour golfers
Golfers from New York (state)
People from East Williston, New York
1901 births
1957 deaths